Oz Blayzer (born December 29, 1992) is an Israeli professional basketball player for Hapoel Jerusalem of the Israeli Basketball Premier League.

Biography
Oz Blayzer was born in Kfar Tavor, Israel. He played with the Hapoel Gilboa-Afula youth team.

Sports career
On August 16, 2011, Blayzer started his professional career with Hapoel Afula of the Liga Leumit.

On July 3, 2013, Blayzer signed a two-year deal with Bnei Herzliya. In his first season with Herzliya, Blayzer was named co-Israeli League Rising Star, alongside his teammate Aviram Zelekovits.

On June 20, 2015, Blayzer signed a two-year contract with Maccabi Haifa.

On May 9, 2016, Blayzer signed a two-year contract extension with Haifa. That season, Blayzer helped Haifa to reach the 2017 Israeli League Finals where they eventually lost to Hapoel Jerusalem.

On March 26, 2018, Blayzer recorded a season-high 25 points without missing a single shot (shooting 6-of-6 from the field and 9-of-9 from the free throw line), along with 3 rebounds and 2 assists in a 98–95 win over Hapoel Gilboa Galil. He was subsequently named Israeli League Round 21 MVP.

On July 18, 2018, Blayzer signed a two-year deal with Maccabi Rishon LeZion.

On August 11, 2020, Blayzer signed with Maccabi Tel Aviv of the Israeli Premier League.

On June 26, 2022, he signed with Hapoel Jerusalem of the Israeli Basketball Premier League.

Israeli national team
Blayzer played for the Israeli National Team at the 2017 Eurobasket tournament.

Blayzer was also a member of the Israeli Under-18  and Under-20 national teams.

References

External links
RealGM.com profile

1992 births
Living people
Bnei Hertzeliya basketball players
Hapoel Afula players
Hapoel Jerusalem B.C. players
Israeli Basketball Premier League players
Israeli men's basketball players
Maccabi Haifa B.C. players
Maccabi Rishon LeZion basketball players
People from Kfar Tavor
Power forwards (basketball)
Small forwards